Harbord Glacier is a glacier in Antarctica, flowing along the south side of Mount George Murray. It enters the Ross Sea south of Whitmer Peninsula where it forms Harbord Glacier Tongue. The name derives from the glacier tongue, which was named by Ernest Shackleton for A.E. Harbord, second officer of the Nimrod during the last year of the British Antarctic Expedition, 1907–09.

References

Glaciers of Victoria Land
Scott Coast